The 1898 Oregon gubernatorial election took place on June 6, 1898 to elect the governor of the U.S. state of Oregon. The election matched Republican Theodore Thurston Geer against Democratic State Senator W. R. King.

Geer was the tenth governor since statehood, but the first native Oregonian to hold that position.

Results

References

Gubernatorial
1898
Oregon
June 1898 events